Jagadish Jani (3 January 1921 – 23 April 2008) was an Indian politician. He was a Member of Parliament, representing Odisha in the Rajya Sabha the upper house of India's Parliament as a member of the Indian National Congress

References

Rajya Sabha members from Odisha
Indian National Congress politicians
1921 births
2008 deaths